Jesús Díez Pinillos (31 May 1931 – 28 March 2003) was a Spanish epee, foil and sabre fencer. He competed in four events at the 1960 Summer Olympics.

References

External links
 

1931 births
2003 deaths
Spanish male épée fencers
Olympic fencers of Spain
Fencers at the 1960 Summer Olympics
Fencers from Madrid
Spanish male foil fencers
Spanish male sabre fencers